Why Bother? is the third studio album from the Detroit band ADULT. All tracks are written and produced by Adam Lee Miller and Nicola Kuperus. Sam Consiglio, a contributor to the band's previous album, Gimmie Trouble, did not return to record this album for undisclosed reasons.

Track listing
"Red Herring"
"The Mythology of Psychosis"
"Good Deeds"
"I Feel Worse When I'm With You"
"The Importance of Being Folk Part I"
"Inclined to Vomit"
"You Don't Worry Enough"
"Cultivation"
"Herd Me"
"R.S.x"
"Plagued by Fear"
"I Should Care"
"The Importance of Being Folk Part II"
"Harvest"

References

External links
Why Bother? at Official ADULT. Site

2007 albums
Adult (band) albums
Thrill Jockey albums